Limnochares is a genus of mites in the family Limnocharidae. There are at least two described species in Limnochares.

Species
These two species belong to the genus Limnochares:
 Limnochares americana Lundblad, 1941
 Limnochares aquatica (Linnaeus, 1758)

References

Further reading

 
 
 
 
 
 
 

Trombidiformes